In American usage, "Bubba" is a term of endearment mainly given to boys. Being formed from the word "brother", it often indicates that someone is an "older brother".

Etymology and history

Robert Ferguson notes in his book English Surnames that "Bubba" corresponds with the German , "boy". This matches Saxon and Hibernian tradition.

Because of its association with the southern part of the United States, "Bubba" is also often used outside the South as a pejorative to mean a person of low economic status and limited education. "Bubba" may also be taken to mean one who is a "good ol' boy". At times, it may be used as a term of endearment (or in an insulting sense) for a person, especially to a man, who is either overweight or has a seemingly powerful large body frame.

Other meanings
In the US Army and Marines, "Bubba" can mean a lazy soldier, similar to "grunt", but with connotations of endearment instead of derision (e.g., "Can you make that device easier to work with, because every Bubba is going to have to use it?").

The word exists in other languages and carries similar meanings. "Bubba" is common in Australia and New Zealand as a noun to refer affectionately to a baby. For example, in Australia, the Queensland State Government has a baby immunisation programme called "BubbaJabs" for Aboriginal babies within the Queensland (https://www.health.qld.gov.au/clinical-practice/guidelines-procedures/diseases-infection/immunisation/bubba-jabs)

In gun culture, "Bubba" is a term used for a person who permanently alters or modifies historic firearms, with no regard for its historical value, or as a verb or adjective to describe the act of or an already modified historical firearm.

In Yiddish, the word Bobe [with a vowel similar to a shortened version of the vowel of caught + beh] means "grandmother" and as a form of address, is often rendered by English speakers as "Bubba" or "Bubbie".

People

Nickname
Bubba Bolden (born 2000), American football player
Bubba Brooks (1922-2002), American jazz tenor saxophonist
Charles "Bubba" Chaney (born 1946), Louisiana politician
Bubba Church (1924–2001), former Major League Baseball player
Bill Clinton (born 1946), 42nd President of the United States
Bubba Crosby (born 1976), Major League Baseball outfielder
Bubba Dickerson (born 1981), PGA Tour golfer
Tommy Facenda (born 1939), rockabilly singer and dancer
Bubba Franks (born 1978), National Football League player
Bubba Green (1957–2019), American football player
Merald "Bubba" Knight (born 1942), soul singer, member of Gladys Knight & the Pips
Bubba Marriott (born 1938), American football player
Bubba Paris (born 1960), former National Football League player
Bubba Phillips (1928–1993), Major League Baseball player
Bubba Shobert (born 1961), former motorcycle racer
Bubba Smith (1945–2011), National Football League player and actor
Clinton "Bubba" Smith (born 19??), star on A&E's reality television show Storage Wars: Texas
James Stewart Jr. (born 1985), professional motocross rider
Darrell Wallace Jr. (born 1993), racing driver
Bubba Watson (born 1978), PGA Tour golfer
Bubba Wells (born 1974), former basketball player
Madilyn "Bubba" Nickles (born 1997), American softball player

Middle name
Bubba Trammell (born 1971), former Major League Baseball player

Stage name
Bubba Ray Dudley, an American professional wrestler, best known for his appearances with Extreme Championship Wrestling and World Wrestling Entertainment
Bubba Sparxxx (born 1977), Southern rapper
Bubba the Love Sponge Clem, radio talk show host

Fictional characters

Films and television
Bubba the Caveduck from The Walt Disney Company's series DuckTales
Bubba Bexley, a recurring character in the situation comedy Sanford and Son
Bubba Bixby, a character from the 2007 television film, Shredderman Rules, a film based on the books
Bubba Bo Bob Brain, Brain's fictitious country music star persona from a Pinky and the Brain segment on the U.S. cartoon series Animaniacs
Plumber Bubba, a fictional comedian based on Larry the Cable Guy and idolized by Rusty and Early Cuyler on the Adult Swim animated series Squidbillies
Benjamin Buford "Bubba" Blue, in the 1994 film Forrest Gump
Landry Clarke, played by Jesse Plemons in the television series Friday Night Lights
Bubba Hendershot, a leading antagonistic-character from the Stephen King directorial debut film Maximum Overdrive; he is portrayed by  Pat Hingle
Bubba Higgins, in the situation comedy Mama's Family
Bubba Ho-tep, a name given to a reanimated Egyptian mummy by Elvis Presley in Joe R. Lansdale's novella and film of the same name
Bubba J, a puppet of ventriloquist Jeff Dunham
Bubba Ritter, played by Larry Drake in the movie Dark Night of the Scarecrow
Leatherface, or Bubba Sawyer, from The Texas Chainsaw Massacre
Bubba Skinner, a leading character from the television series In the Heat of the Night
Bubba Zanetti, in the 1979 film Mad Max
Ross "Bubba" Webster, a character played by Richard Pryor in the 1983 superhero film Superman III

Games
Bubba, one of the protagonists in the Amiga computer game Bubba 'n' Stix
Bubba, a character in Jagged Alliance 2
Bubba, a zombie in an event of Killing Floor
Bubba, a monster from Rampage: Total Destruction
Bubba, one of the protagonists of Redneck Rampage
Bubba, a giant fish in Super Mario 64
Bubba, one of Spunge's default names in My Singing Monsters
Bubba, one of the protagonists of the original Grand Theft Auto

Literature
Bubba, a minor character in A Drink Before the War
Bubba, a character in Charlaine Harris' Southern Vampire Series and a "codename" for Elvis, who is now a vampire in this series
Alvin "Bubba" Bixby, the bully in Wendelin Van Draanen's Shredderman series.
Bubba Kelly, a character in Carson McCullers' novel The Heart Is a Lonely Hunter
Bubba Spuckler, one of two Norfolk brothers frequently lampooned in The Suffolk Gazette

Other uses
Bubba (fish) (d. 2006), the first fish known to have undergone chemotherapy

See also
Bubber
Sissy, a similar nickname for girls, from "sister"

References

Informal personal names
Lists of people by nickname
Pejorative terms for men
English masculine given names
Brothers